Dnipropetrovsk is the soviet era name of the city Dnipro in Ukraine, it may refer to:

 Dnipro (formerly Dnipropetrovsk), Dnipro Raion, Dnipropetrovsk Oblast, Ukraine; the city
 Dnipro Raion (formerly Dnipropetrovsk Raion), Dnipropetrovsk Oblast, Ukraine; a district
 Dnipropetrovsk Oblast, Ukraine; a province
 Dnipro International Airport, (formerly Dnipropetrovsk International Airport), Ukraine
 
 Dnepropetrovsk maniacs, Ukrainian serial killers

See also

 Dniprovskyi District, Kyiv, Ukraine
 Dnipropetrovsk Mafia, a group of Soviet politicians
 
 Dniprovskyi District (disambiguation)
 Dnipro Dnipropetrovsk (disambiguation)
 Dnipro (disambiguation)